Lot 39 is a township in Kings County, Prince Edward Island, Canada.  It is part of St. Patrick's Parish. Lot 39 was one of four lots awarded to the officers of the 78th Fraser Highlanders in the 1767 land lottery. Col. Thomas Dawson purchased  of land in Lot 39 on March 19, 1800, for 135 pounds, 8 shillings and 4 pence, later adding another .  He emigrated from Coote Hill, County Cavan, Ireland with wife Elizabeth and six children, arriving in PEI on June 6, 1801.  Col. Thomas Dawson (1762–1804) called his new property Dawson's Grove, after a Dawson family property in Ireland.  He is buried at Elm Avenue Cemetery, Charlottetown, PEI.

References

39
Geography of Kings County, Prince Edward Island